Boisar is the largest industrial suburb in the Mumbai Metropolitan Region in the Indian state of Maharashtra. It was originally a part of the Thane district before becoming a part of the Palghar district. It is located in the district Palghar  in Maharashtra.

Boisar is governed by the Palghar Municipal Council (PMC). It is home to the largest Maharashtra Industrial Development Corporation (MIDC).

Boisar hosts India's first nuclear power stationTarapur Atomic Power Station (TAPS). It has a railway station in the Western Railway zone of Indian Railways as well as Mumbai Suburban Railway. The Mumbai–Ahmedabad high-speed rail corridor will have a stop at Boisar.

In Boisar, Yashwant shrusti, Harmony residency and Ostwal like area's are well developed compared to other places of Boisar because of this the cost of flats and rooms is quite expensive.There are some beautiful park's and resorts. Boisar is industrial, chemical hub but IT sector is also developing in Boisar.

Boisar is a popular weekend spot for tourists and locals due to nearby beaches, forts and lakes. The place has seen rapid development due to: 
 The existence of more than 1500 industrial units.
 Its proximity to Mumbai & Gujarat.
 Easy access by train and road. 

 Availability of surplus power and water.
 Its vicinity of Maharashtra's largest fishing port Satpati.
 The upcoming Mumbai-Ahmedabad bullet train having a stop at Boisar.
The upcoming Delhi–Mumbai Industrial Corridor Project (DMIC) being planned to pass via Boisar.
 The upcoming Mumbai-Vadodara expressway.
 The expansion of sea transport project.

Demonym 
A resident of Boisar is called a Boisarkar, Boisarean, or Boisary in Marathi, in which the suffixes "kar"', "ean" and "y" means "resident of" or "to belong to". Boisar is located within the Mumbai Metropolitan Region of Maharashtra.

History 

Boisar city was part of the Rashtrakuta dynasty which had ruled the Deccan plateau between the 8th and 10th centuries. It was ruled by Ahmadnagar (1521–1594), the Portuguese Empire (1594), the Maratha Empire (1739–1818), the East India Company (1818–1857) and the British Raj (1857–1947). There are some forts near the city, such as Asava Fort (11 km), Tarapur Fort, Kaldurg Fort(), Shirgaon Fort, Mahim Fort, and Asheri Fort. 

Boisar was initially inhabited by the Kolis and Konkanis who were fish and used to live in the Arabian Sea coast. The Kolis are traditional fishermen who speak different dialects of Marathi.

The present Vanjari community of Boisar was part of the Indus Valley civilization and originate from Chittorgarh, Rajasthan. In the 15th century they served as a main grain trader, supplier and salesman in the Mughal army of Alauddin Khalji. They migrated to "Moradi" port (today "Murbe") to trade in Boisar because the British started the railway in 1853 which halted the grain trade. Their language is distinct from standard Marathi as it influenced by Rajasthani and Gujarati.

The Vadval community is located in Boisar, Tarapur. They are said to be the descendants of Yadava dynasty of Devagiri who escaped from the Muslims. They form one of the few Marathi-speaking communities which belong to Kshatriya varna but not the traditional 96-clan Maratha caste.

Boisar was town in Bombay state between 18th to 19th century. It was also city in the Thane district after the independence of India. Palghar district is the current district of Boisar from 1 August 2014.

Geography
It is close to Maharashtra, Gujarat, and Daman. People in and around Boisar use Marathi as a common language.

Hydrography
The two main rivers flowing through the city are the Surya and the Banganga (which has Betegaon Railway Bridge). Many small creeks are found all along the western coast villages like Kolwade, Kumbhavali, and Murbe where tidal waters flood upstream. There are dams such as the Surya Dam and the Devkhop dam.

Boisar has no natural lakes but it has artificial ones. The Babule Lake and Navale Lake near the city are known for lotus blooms in winter.

The Kokner/Kokaner hot water spring is on the banks on the Surya river; the water is a murky greenish brown due to sulphur & chemical deposits from the spring.

Pedology
Basalt and medium deep grayish black soil are found in the hill area and deep black soils are found in the basins of Surya river. Coastal saline soil occurs along the Arabian Sea. Other than basalt, minor minerals like murrum are found in the city.

Climate

According to the Köppen climate classification, the climate of Boisar is tropical, very humid, and warm because of the western coastal plains. The city experiences three main seasons and one transitional season. They are:
Winter Season (December to February).
Summer Season (March to June).
Monsoon Season (June to September).
Post Monsoon Season / Autumn (October and November): Hot and humid in the coastal areas.

Demographics
Census India 2011 reported a total of 20319 males and 15832 females and a total number of 4896 children below 6 years of age in Boisar. The  is around 919 compared to the Maharashtra state average of 894. The literacy rate of Boisar is 88.49%, higher than the state average of 82.34%. The city has complete administration over 8,711 houses to which it supplies basic amenities like water and sewerage. It is also authorized to build roads within town limits and impose taxes on properties under its jurisdiction. Out of its total population, 14,372 are employed; 12,312 were males while 2,060 were females. In the census survey, a worker is defined as person who performs a job, service, cultivation, or labour. Of the 14372 people that were surveyed to be working, 89.32% were engaged in main work while 10.68% of total workers were engaged in marginal work.

Religion
According to the 2011 census, out of a total of 36,151 people in Boisar, Hindus (83.84%) constituted the majority of the city population. Schedule Caste (SC) constituted 4.82% while Schedule Tribe (ST) were 1.76% of the total population. The official language of Boisar is Marathi but Hindi and English are also allowed to be used for any official purpose. Marathi is the most widely spoken language with Vanjari, Agri, Koli, Vadvali and Warli dialects. Small communities of Gujaratis and Muslims speak Gujarati and Urdu respectively. Marathi, Hindi, and English are compulsory languages in schools whereas Sanskrit and Urdu are optional.

Culture

Festivals
Boisar residents celebrate Marathi, Indian, and Western festivals. Ganesh Chaturthi and Gokulashtami/Dahi Handi are popular festivals in the city. Some other festivals celebrated in the city are :

Transportation

Railway Station

 Boisar railway station is the main mode of transportation.
 All local trains runs between Dahanu and Churchgate; Dahanu-Virar has a stop at Boisar railway station.
 It is part of the Western Railway zone of Indian Railways.
 There are some local trains and express trains that run through Boisar station to the Mumbai Central line and Central Railway zone of Indian Railways via the Boisar-Vasai-Bhiwandi-Panvel railway route.
  
 Boisar railway station has 3 platforms and multiple tracks. After a period of neglect, it has become properly maintained.

Road
Transportation inside city is done by three-wheeled buses auto rickshaws.
(Boisar-Palghar), (Boisar-Navapur, Nandgaon, Alewadi and Kumbhavali) and (Boisar-Tarapur) are connected via 10-seat passenger auto rickshaws and Maharashtra State Road Transport Corporation buses.
 Maharashtra State Road Transport Corporation provides AC and non AC bus services to other cities in Maharashtra.
Boisar is connected to national highway NH 48, which connects to Maharashtra and Gujarat.

Boat Services
In city, the coastal area usually commutes by ferry. Routes are defined by Maharashtra Maritime Board.
 Navapur to Dandi.
 Murbe to Satpati.
 Murbe to Kharekuran.
 Ferries are available throughout the year from 6 am to 6 pm, except during monsoons. Timings of ferry can change depending on the tide.

Air
Boisar has no airport.

Education

Schools and Higher Secondary Schools (Junior Colleges)
There are schools and junior colleges in Boisar. Mmost of them are run by private individuals and trusts. The city's public school system and junior colleges are managed by the education ministry of the Government of Maharashtra. The schools and junior colleges are affiliated with the following boards:

Maharashtra State Board of Secondary and Higher Secondary Education. 
Secondary School Certificate (SSC): 10th grade.
Higher School Certificate (HSC): 12th grade.
Central Board of Secondary Education (CBSE).
Indian Certificate of Secondary Education (ICSE).

Institutes headquartered in city proximity

Professional Programme (Internship and Apprenticeship)
Boisar is known for its industrial hub and most industries (especially chemical, pharmaceutical, textile and mechanical companies) offer internship and apprenticeship programs to college undergraduates and postgraduates. Banks and hospitals also provide work experience for students and professionals.

Research Institutions
Boisar is home to two prominent research institutions: the Bhabha Atomic Research Centre (BARC) and the Agricultural Research Station.

Notable people

 Shardul Thakur Indian cricketer, CSK player, lives here

See also
 Boisar-Vidhan Sabha constituency
Boisar Railway Station
 Tarapur Atomic Power Station
Township in Boisar-Sai Baba Boulevard

References

Neighbourhoods in Thane
Palghar district
Cities and towns in Palghar district
Townships in India
Planned communities